is a Japanese football player for Toyama Shinjo from 2023.

Career 

On 10 November 2022, Inoue leave from the club in 2022 after Veertien Mie expiration contract that player.

On 24 December 2022, Inoue joined to hometown club, Toyama Shinjo for upcoming 2023 season.

Club statistics 

Updated to the end 2022 season.

Club

References

External links 

Profile at Football Lab

1994 births
Living people
Association football people from Toyama Prefecture
Japanese footballers
J3 League players
Japan Football League players
Iwate Grulla Morioka players
Cobaltore Onagawa players
Veertien Mie players
Association football midfielders